WNTF (1580 AM) is a radio station broadcasting a Vietnamese format. It is licensed to Bithlo, Florida, United States, and serves the Orlando area. The station is owned by Shanti Persaud, through licensee Unity Broadcasting LLC.

http://cflradio.net/1580_WNTF_AM.htm shows the station's history but does not mention Vietnamese language programming.

External links

NTF (AM)
1958 establishments in Florida
Radio stations established in 1958
NTF
Vietnamese-language radio stations in the United States